Glenn Mosley may refer to:

 Glenn Mosley (minister), American reverend and theologian
 Glenn Mosley (basketball) (born 1955), American basketball player